On November 7, 2006, the District of Columbia held a U.S. House of Representatives election for its shadow representative. Unlike its non-voting delegate, the shadow representative is only recognized by the district and is not officially sworn or seated. Incumbent Shadow Representative Ray Browne did not run for reelection and fellow Democrat Mike Panetta was elected in his place.

Primary elections
Primary elections were held on September 12, 2006. Forster withdrew from the race at the beginning of September but his name remained on the ballot and he still received thousands of votes.

Democratic primary

Candidates
 James S. Bubar, attorney and delegate for John Kerry at the Democratic National Convention
 John J. Forster (withdrew)
 Mike Panetta, Director of Public Affairs at Grassroots Enterprise

Results

Statehood Green primary
 Keith R. Ware, Nature Green owner

Results

Other primaries
A Republican primary was held but no candidates filed and only write-in votes were cast. Nelson Rimensnyder ran as a Republican in the general election.

General election
The general election took place on November 7, 2006.

Results

References

Washington, D.C., Shadow Representative elections
2006 elections in Washington, D.C.